San Marino made their Eurovision Young Musicians debut at the Eurovision Young Musicians 2016 in Cologne, Germany.

Contestants

See also
San Marino in the Eurovision Song Contest
San Marino in the Junior Eurovision Song Contest

References

External links
 Eurovision Young Musicians

Countries in the Eurovision Young Musicians